Hezekiah was a king of Judah.

Hezekiah may also refer to (alphabetically, by surname if there is one, including prefixes such as "ben"/"bar"):

Hezekiah (Amora), Talmud sage of the Amoraim period in the Land of Israel
Hezekiah (governor) (Yehezqiyah), late 4th-century governor and possibly High Priest of Persian Judah or/and Ptolemaic Judah
Hezekiah (Khazar), 9th-century Khazar ruler
Hezekiah (rapper) (active from 1995), American rapper, hip-hop producer, songwriter, and founder of Beat Society
Hezekiah Linthicum Bateman (18121875), 19th-century American actor and manager
Hezekiah ben Manoah or bar Manoah, rabbi from 13th-century France
Hezekiah Gaon, last Gaon of the Yeshiva of Pumbedita, 10381040
Hezekiah Hunter (1837–1894), teacher, minister, and politician.
 Hezekiah Jones, main character of the 1948 poem "Black Cross (Hezekiah Jones)" by Joseph Simon Newman, recorded by Lord Buckley and by Bob Dylan
Chaim Hezekiah Medini (18341905), rabbi who worked among the Krymchaks
Hezekiah Niles (17771839), 19th-century American newspaperman
Hezekiah Ochuka (19531987), ruler of Kenya for six hours in 1982
Hezekiah Bradley Smith (18161887), American politician and bigamist
Hezekiah Walker, American gospel artist

See also
 
All pages containing Hezekiah